The 2006–07 season was Sevilla Fútbol Club's sixth consecutive season in La Liga. The team manager in the previous season, Juande Ramos, continued with the team. That season, the team won its second consecutive UEFA Cup in a very special final match against another Spanish team (Espanyol) and was the leader of La Liga for first time since the 1945–46 season, when the team won its only league championship. Sevilla also won its fourth Copa del Rey against Getafe.

Trophies balance

Competitive balance

Summer transfers

In

Out

Loan out

Loan return

Loan end

Winter transfers

In

Loan out

Squad
 Updated to 17 June 2007

Youth system

Match results

Pre-season

Friendly matches

2006 Trofeo Colombino

UEFA Super Cup

Final

Primera División

 Win   Draw   Lost

 La Liga Winner (also qualified for 2007–08 UEFA Champions League Group Stage)
 2007–08 UEFA Champions League Group Stage
 2007–08 UEFA Champions League 3rd Qualifying Round
 2007–08 UEFA Cup 3rd Qualifying Round
 2007 UEFA Intertoto Cup Final
 Relegation to Liga BBVA

UEFA Cup

Third Qualifying Round

Sevilla won 6–1 on aggregate

Group stage

Round of 32

Sevilla won 3–0 on aggregate

Round of 16

Sevilla FC won 5–4 on aggregate

Quarter-finals

Sevilla won 4–3 on aggregate

Semi-finals

Sevilla won 2–1 on aggregate

Final

Copa del Rey

Round of 32

Sevilla FC won 4–0 on aggregate

Round of 16

Sevilla won 3–1 on aggregate

Quarter-finals

Sevilla won 1–0 on aggregate

Semi-finals

Sevilla FC won 5–0 on aggregate

Final

References

2006-07
Sevilla
2006-07